The Lincoln Park Patriots were an American minor pro ice hockey team in Lincoln Park, Michigan. They played in the All-American Hockey League in the 1988-89 season. They folded after their first season.

Season-by-season record

External links

 The Internet Hockey Database
All-American Hockey League teams
Ice hockey teams in Michigan
Ice hockey clubs established in 1988
Sports clubs disestablished in 1989
1988 establishments in Michigan
1989 disestablishments in Michigan